This is a list of paddlesports organizations in Canada. These paddle sport organizations and clubs oversee various competitive sports involving watercraft propelled using a paddle. Some paddle sports include dragonboat racing, swanboat racing, canoe racing and kayak racing.

Competitive associations 
 Canoe Kayak Canada (Canadian Canoe Association)
 Go Rowing and Paddling Association of Canada operated from 1996 to 2014

Recreational associations 
 Paddle Canada
 Formerly the Canadian Recreational Canoeing Association. Founded by John Eberhard and Ron Johnstone (1971). Affiliated organizations:
 Paddle Alberta
 Canoe Kayak New Brunswick
 Paddle Newfoundland and Labrador
 Canoe Kayak Nova Scotia
 Eau Vive Québec
 Paddle Manitoba
 Canoe Kayak Saskatchewan
 Canot Kayak Québec
 Ontario Recreational Canoeing and Kayaking Association (ORCKA)
 Recreational Canoeing Association of British Columbia (RCABC)
 Whitewater Kayaking Association of British Columbia (WKABC)

Clubs

British Columbia 
 Kelowna Canoe and Kayak Club
 Kelowna Dragon Boat Club
 Kelowna Outrigger Canoe Club
 Kelowna Rowing Club
 Vancouver Kayak Club (VKC)
Beaver Canoe Club www.BeaverCanoeClub.org

Ontario 

Burloak Canoe Club
Rideau Canoe Club

Nova Scotia 

Mic Mac AAC

Paddle
Paddlesports organizations in Canada
Canoeing in Canada